Mayhem (Brigid O'Reilly) is a fictional character appearing in American comic books published by Marvel Comics.

Publication history
The character of detective Brigid O'Reilly first appeared in Cloak and Dagger #1 (Oct. 1983) and was created by Bill Mantlo and Rick Leonardi. She subsequently appeared in issues #2-4 (Nov. 1983-Jan. 1984) of the same series, and issues #1-5 (July 1985-March 1986) of the second Cloak and Dagger series.

In Cloak and Dagger vol. 2 #5 (March 1986), Brigid underwent a drastic transformation and became known as Mayhem. The character subsequently appeared, as Mayhem, in Cloak and Dagger #6-9 (May–Nov. 1986), Strange Tales #13-15 (April–June 1988), #19 (Oct. 1988), The Mutant Misadventures of Cloak and Dagger #1-2 (Oct. Dec. 1988), #5-6 (June, Aug. 1989), #8 (Nov. 1989), #10-18 (Feb. 1990-June 1991), Web of Spider-Man Annual #9 (1993) and #10 (1994).

Mayhem received an entry in The Official Handbook of the Marvel Universe Deluxe Edition #8. However, some of the color plates were reversed in that issue; those pages, including Mayhem, were re-printed correctly in issue #9.

Fictional character biography
Brigid O'Reilly was originally a police detective in Manhattan when she learned that Cloak and Dagger were attacking criminals in her precinct. She at first wanted to bring the pair to justice, but she eventually learned to trust the young crime-fighters.

Later, she took a squad of police officers to investigate a warehouse belonging to the same pharmaceutical company that was behind Cloak's and Dagger's powers. Some corrupt policemen, led by Roger Falcone, exposed the other police officers to a gas to asphyxiate them.  With her dying breath, Brigid swore vengeance on Falcone. As Brigid lay dying, Cloak and Dagger found her, and though were too late to save the other police, Cloak surrounded her and Dagger with darkness, while Dagger tried to revive her with light. When this appeared not to work, the pair abandoned her body to search for those responsible.

Though O'Reilly died, she was reborn as Mayhem. In this new form, Mayhem helped Cloak and Dagger find and fight the corrupt police. She then killed Falcone as promised. She then became a vigilante, showing no mercy to the drug dealers and other criminals she pursues.

Brigid was considered as a "potential recruit" for the Initiative program, according to Civil War: Battle Damage Report.

Powers and abilities
Mayhem exudes a green, venomous gas from her pores. If this gas enters another person's bloodstream, it paralyzes the person for a varying amount of time. Hence, Mayhem attacks people by raking their skin with her talon-like fingernails so that the gas will enter their bloodstreams.

The gas can also act like a truth serum, forcing a victim of Mayhem to tell her the truth.

Dagger's "light-knives" dissipate upon contact with this gas.

Mayhem can levitate herself and fly.

Other versions
The Ultimate Marvel version of Brigid O'Reilly is a NYPD officer who is hunting down teenage criminals Styx and Stone in an effort to trace the Serpent Skulls gang. Her partner Terry Schreck is critically injured and soon dies in the hospital. She later speaks to her informant Bart Rozum before learning that Terry's body had disappeared from the morgue.

In other media
Brigid O'Reilly appears in the live-action Marvel Cinematic Universe (MCU) television show Marvel's Cloak & Dagger, portrayed by Emma Lahana. Introduced in the first season, this version is a detective who formerly worked in Harlem before moving to New Orleans. She grows suspicious of her partner, corrupt police officer James Connors, which she later confirms afterward with help from Tandy Bowen. O'Reilly soon allies with Tyrone Johnson, who wants to avenge his brother's death at the hands of Connors. They succeed in getting Connors to admit his guilt and see him arrested. However, O'Reilly discovers her boyfriend was murdered. Additionally, Connors is released on suspension and proceeds to beat her in front of other officers to reinforce her outcast status among them. O'Reilly joins forces with Johnson to stop a dark energy called the Terror from being released by the Roxxon company, but is shot by Connors, exposed to the Terror's energy, and falls into a swamp, though she later re-emerges with glowing green eyes. In the second season, it is revealed that this O'Reilly, later named Mayhem, is a physical copy of the original with all of her memories and knowledge. However, Mayhem is a ruthless vigilante with no compunction about murder. In the opening episodes, Mayhem proceeds to kill a number of New Orleans underworld figures, and later assumes O'Reilly's identity to take a criminal investigation into her own hands. In the meantime, Johnson finds O'Reilly tied up at home, then teleports them to Bowen, who is at a crime scene with Mayhem. Following this, Mayhem searches for Connors, killing his partner in the process. While examining O'Reilly, Roxxon environmentalist Mina Hess theorizes and later proves the former was split between two forms, with O'Reilly representing her fear and Mayhem her aggression. Amidst a criminal investigation into a prostitution ring, Mayhem attacks and nearly kills a criminal gang before Johnson uses his powers to send her to the Darkforce Dimension. Bowen follows Mayhem, unwittingly depriving Johnson of his powers. Together, Mayhem and Bowen find evidence of Connors' presence and endeavor to leave the Dimension, but Bowen accidentally exits the Dimension with Connors, leaving Mayhem behind. Mayhem later finds Andre Deschaine's metaphysical record store and destroys his records, which held his victims' despair; freeing Johnson from Deschaine's spell and allowing him to rescue Bowen from Deschaine's prostitution ring. After ending up in the Loa Dimension, O'Reilly encounters Mayhem, and the two agree to allow the latter to take control on certain occasions. Once they leave, they are fused back together. Mayhem later defends Johnson's friend Evita from forces that threatened to foil Johnson and Bowen's mission to stop Deschaine and O'Reilly leaves Connors' dead body for her fellow police officers to see.

References

External links
 Mayhem at the Marvel Wiki

Characters created by Bill Mantlo
Comics characters introduced in 1986
Fictional detectives
Marvel Comics female superheroes
Marvel Comics police officers
Marvel Comics superheroes
Vigilante characters in comics